Hindhead is a village in Surrey, England. It is the highest village in Surrey, with buildings at between 185 and 253 metres above sea level. It is best known as the location of the Devil's Punch Bowl, a beauty spot and site of special scientific interest, and as the site of the Hindhead crossroads, a formerly notorious congestion spot, where the A3 between Portsmouth and London was crossed by the A287 between Hook and Haslemere. The A3 now passes under Hindhead in the Hindhead Tunnel and its route along the Punch Bowl has been removed and landscaped, but the crossroads still exists for local traffic, as a double mini-roundabout. 

It is a ward in the district of Waverley, and part of the civil parish of Haslemere. The ward, which includes Beacon Hill, had a population of 4,292 at the 2011 Census. 

The place-name "Hindhead" is first attested in 1571, and means "hill frequented by hinds", or female deer.

Geography

Land use, elevations and soil types
The settled parts of the village are elevated relative to all of the surrounding parishes and are a mixture of paved streets and wooded roads as well as agricultural smallholdings, which are few compared with other parts of Waverley District. These rise gradually from the rest of the village towards the north of the Greensand Ridge, upon which the village wholly lies. The soil is near its surface a sort of crumbly sandstone here known as greensand which breaks up forest into acidic heathland in many places. It supports endemic types of fungi, ferns, gorse and heather.

Features
The north of the village forms the Devil's Punch Bowl, a large wooded beauty spot and a site of special scientific interest.  Much of the north and east of the village is rolling woodland which forms part of the Surrey Hills Area of Outstanding Natural Beauty.

History

This area was notorious for highwaymen. In 1736, Stephen Phillips, a robber tried and convicted at the Old Bailey, admitted to the Newgate chaplain to having stolen 150 guineas in gold on the road towards London. In 1786, three men were convicted of the murder of an unknown sailor on his way from London to rejoin his ship, a deed commemorated by several memorials in the area. The perpetrators were hung in chains to warn others on Gibbet Hill, a short walk away on top of the Devil's Punch Bowl. With an increase in traffic and opening of the London to Portsmouth railway line removing much of the road transport of freight, such incidents reduced during the 19th century.

Hindhead became a substantial settlement in the late 19th century. In 1904 a temporary mission church was built to serve the new community. An architectural competition to design a permanent church, that of St Albans in Beacon Hill, was held in 1906, and John Duke Coleridge (1879–1934) was chosen as the architect. The first phase, comprising the chancel, north chapel, transept and the lower stage of a projected bell tower, was completed by 1907, and the church gained its own parish in the same year. A series of windows by the Arts and Crafts designers Karl Parsons and Christopher Whall were installed in the unfinished church between 1908 and 1912. The three eastern bays of the nave were consecrated in 1915, but the two western bays were not built until 1929–31; the bell-tower was never completed and became in effect a south transept. There followed two additional stained-glass windows: by Christopher Webb in 1945 and by Francis Skeat in 1950. A large vestry extension was added in 1964. A fire in 1999 destroyed the original high altar and reredos paintings.

Notable people

 Grant Allen (1848–1899), the Canadian-born novelist, lived at "Hilltop". Conan Doyle was one of Allen's neighbours and became his friend; he completed Allen's novel Hilda Wade after Allen's death.
 Peter Alliss (1931–2020), professional golfer and commentator, lived in Hindhead.
Sir Arthur Conan Doyle lived at "Undershaw" from 1897 to 1907. Here he wrote some of his best-known novels, including The Hound of the Baskervilles. Undershaw later became a hotel and restaurant, but this closed in 2004 and the property is now a school. Conan Doyle was Hindhead Golf Club's first President in 1904.
 Miss James built and lived at West Down, donating land to the National Trust which now features Miss James' Walk and the Miss James footbridge over the A3 road. 
 Field Marshal Sir Bernard Montgomery  (1887–1976) took the title of "Viscount Montgomery of Alamein, of Hindhead in the County of Surrey" when he was raised to the peerage in 1946.
 Playwright George Bernard Shaw lived at "Blen Cathra" in Hindhead, now the site of St Edmund's School.
 The scientist John Tyndall (1820–1893) lived and died in the village at Hindhead House, now on "Tyndalls", named after him. He is best known for his work on the discovery of the greenhouse effect.

Government
For the purposes of local government, Hindhead is within the civil parish of Haslemere, the district of Waverley and the county of Surrey. Hindhead forms a ward for elections to Haslemere Town Council and Waverley Borough Council, and is part of the Waverley Western Villages electoral division for Surrey County Council elections. The ward elects a single county councillor, two district councillors and five town councillors. 

Hindhead is within the UK constituency of South West Surrey and was in the European constituency of South East England.

Transport

Until 2011, Hindhead village was situated on the main A3 road between London and Portsmouth. In that year, a £371 million bypass was completed, reducing the amount of traffic passing through the village. The bypass includes the  twin-bore tunnel, the longest non-estuarial road tunnel in the UK.

The village is served by the A287, between Hook and Haslemere, and the A333, a stretch of the former A3 that links the village south to the new bypass. The section of the old A3 north of Hindhead and alongside the Devil's Punch Bowl has been returned to tree-interspersed heathland.

Hindhead is served by several Stagecoach South bus routes linking nearby towns and villages and connections further afield, and National Express Coaches between Portsmouth and London.

Nearest settlements
Neighbouring settlements are Beacon Hill (administratively part of Hindhead, while geographically separate) and Grayshott village.

See also
List of places of worship in Waverley (borough)

References

External links 

 Highways Agency A3 Hindhead improvement
 Hilltop Writers, a Victorian Colony among the Surrey Hills — documenting 66 authors who lived in and around Hindhead at the end of the Victorian era
 Hindhead Together: A Joint Advisory Committee for the Redevelopment of Hindhead

Road junctions in England
Villages in Surrey
Haslemere